Aniket Vinod Choudhary (born 28 January 1990) is an Indian professional cricketer who plays for Rajasthan in domestic cricket. He is a left-arm medium-fast bowler. He was a member of the Kings XI Punjab squad in 2013. In 2013, he played for India A. He made his List A debut on 27 February 2014, for Rajasthan in the 2013–14 Vijay Hazare Trophy.

In February 2017, he was bought by the Royal Challengers Bangalore team for the 2017 Indian Premier League for 2 crores. In January 2018, he was bought by the Royal Challengers Bangalore in the 2018 IPL auction. He was the leading wicket-taker for Rajasthan in the group-stage of the 2018–19 Ranji Trophy, with 47 dismissals in eight matches.

In August 2019, he was named in the India Blue team's squad for the 2019–20 Duleep Trophy.

References

External links

Living people
1990 births
Indian cricketers
India Green cricketers
Rajasthan cricketers
Royal Challengers Bangalore cricketers
People from Bikaner
Punjab Kings cricketers